Talaus is a genus of crab spiders in the family Thomisidae, containing thirteen species.

Species
 Talaus beccarii Benjamin, 2020 — Malaysia (Borneo)
Talaus dulongjiang Tang, Yin, Ubick & Peng, 2008 — China
 Talaus elegans Thorell, 1890 — Indonesia (Sumatra)
 Talaus limbatus Simon, 1895 — South Africa
 Talaus nanus Thorell, 1890 — Myanmar, Malaysia (Borneo), Indonesia (Java) 
 Talaus niger Tang, Yin, Ubick & Peng, 2008 — China
 Talaus oblitus O. P.-Cambridge, 1899 — Sri Lanka
 Talaus opportunus (O. P.-Cambridge, 1873) — Sri Lanka
 Talaus samchi Ono, 2001 — Bhutan
 Talaus semicastaneus Simon, 1909 — Vietnam
 Talaus sulcus Tang & Li, 2010 — China
 Talaus triangulifer Simon, 1886 — Malaysia (Borneo), Indonesia (Borneo, Sumatra)
 Talaus xiphosus Zhu & Ono, 2007 — China

References

Thomisidae
Araneomorphae genera
Spiders of Africa
Spiders of Asia